Blue wren is: 

a colloquial name used to refer to several species of fairywren

Superb fairywren, found in south-eastern Australia
Splendid fairywren, found in central and south-western Australia

 a Code Name
 Ana Montes, American, convicted Cuban spy